Max Bennett (May 24, 1928 – September 14, 2018) was an American jazz bassist and session musician.

Early life
Bennett grew up in Kansas City, Missouri and Oskaloosa, Iowa, and went to college in Iowa.

Career
His first professional gig was with Herbie Fields in 1949, and following this he played with Georgie Auld, Terry Gibbs, and Charlie Ventura. He served in the Army during the Korean War from 1951 to 1953, and then played with Stan Kenton before moving to Los Angeles. There he played regularly at the Lighthouse Cafe with his own ensemble, and played behind such vocalists as Peggy Lee, Ella Fitzgerald, Joni Mitchell and Joan Baez through the 1970s.  He also recorded with Charlie Mariano, Conte Candoli, Bob Cooper, Bill Holman, Stan Levey, Lou Levy, Coleman Hawkins and Jack Montrose.

Bennett recorded under his own name from the late 1950s and did extensive work as a composer and studio musician in addition to jazz playing. Often associated with The Wrecking Crew, he performed on many records by The Monkees and The Partridge Family.

In 1969, Bennett served as the principal bassist for Frank Zappa's Hot Rats project. According to Bennett, "I was not familiar with Zappa’s music. Our paths never crossed. I was never a big fan of avant garde music in that sense. It was while I was working in the studio, what was it, 1967 [sic], I think? And I got a call from John Guerin. He said, ‘Get your stuff over to TTG’—that was in Hollywood—‘I got a double session for you with Frank Zappa.’ So we get there and we worked two double sessions for two nights. And that was the album, that was Hot Rats.” He also played on later Zappa albums such as Chunga's Revenge.

His studio work also included bass on the 1969 Lalo Schifrin soundtrack to the 1968 film Bullitt as well as Greatest Science Fiction Hits Volumes 1-3 with Neil Norman & His Cosmic Orchestra.

In 1973, Guerin and Bennett joined Tom Scott's L.A. Express alongside Joe Sample and Larry Carlton. After recording their eponymous debut album, the jazz fusion quintet served as the core band for Mitchell's Court and Spark (1974). A subsequent iteration of the group (including guitarist Robben Ford and pianist Larry Nash) backed Mitchell on the live Miles of Aisles (1974) and recorded two smooth jazz albums for Caribou Records following Scott's departure in 1976. After the band's dissolution, Bennett formed his own group, Freeway. He continued to perform with his last group, Private Reserve, until his death in 2018.

Discography

As leader
 Max Bennett Quintet (Bethlehem, 1955)
 Max Bennett Sextet (Bethlehem, 1956)
 Max Bennett Septet, Quartet & Trio (Bethlehem, 1956)
 Max Bennett with Charlie Mariano (Bethlehem)
 Interchange (Palo Alto, 1987) U.S. Top Contemporary Jazz #13
 The Drifter (1987) U.S. Top Contemporary Jazz #21
 Images (TBA, 1989)
 Great Expectations (Chase Music, 1993)
 Max Is the Factor (Fresh Sound, 2006)

As sideman
With Hoyt Axton
 Southbound (A&M Records, 1975)
With Joan Baez
 Diamonds & Rust (A&M Records, 1975)
With Stephen Bishop
 Careless (ABC Records, 1976)
With Bobby Bland
 His California Album (Dunhill, 1973)
With David Blue
 Com'n Back for More (Asylum, 1975)
With Terence Boylan
 Terence Boylan (Asylum, 1977)
With Elkie Brooks
 Rich Man's Woman (A&M Records, 1975)
With Vikki Carr
 Ms. America (Columbia, 1973)
With Keith Carradine
 I'm Easy (Asylum, 1976)
With Ry Cooder
 Ry Cooder (Reprise Records, 1970)
With Bob Cooper
 Coop! The Music of Bob Cooper (Contemporary, 1958)
With Bobby Darin
 Bobby Darin Sings The Shadow of Your Smile (Atlantic, 1966)
With The 5th Dimension
 Living Together, Growing Together (Bell, 1973)
With José Feliciano
 Just Wanna Rock 'n' Roll (RCA Victor, 1975)
With Michael Franks
 Michael Franks (Brut, 1973)
With Art Garfunkel
 Breakaway (Columbia Records, 1975)
With Cyndi Grecco
 Making Our Dreams Come True (Private Stock Records, 1976)
With Arlo Guthrie
 Hobo's Lullaby (Reprise Records, 1972)
With George Harrison
 Dark Horse (Apple Records, 1974)
With Jack Jones
 Harbour (RCA Victor, 1974)
 What I Did for Love (RCA Victor, 1975)
With Stan Kenton
 Contemporary Concepts (Capitol, 1955)
With Bill LaBounty
 Promised Love (Curb Records, 1975)
With Peggy Lee
 The Man I Love (Capitol Records, 1957)
 Pretty Eyes (Capitol Records, 1960)
 If You Go (Capitol, 1961)
 Sugar 'n' Spice (Capitol Records, 1962)
 Blues Cross Country (Capitol Records, 1962)
 Mink Jazz (Capitol Records, 1963)
 I'm a Woman (Capitol Records, 1963)
 In Love Again! (Capitol Records, 1964)
 Then Was Then – Now Is Now! (Capitol Records, 1965)
 Big $pender (Capitol Records, 1966)
 Guitars a là Lee (Capitol Records, 1966)
 Bridge over Troubled Water (Capitol Records, 1970)
 Make It with You (Capitol Records, 1970)
 Close Enough for Love (DRG Records, 1979)
With Lori Lieberman
 A Piece of Time (Capitol Records, 1974)
With Lulu
 Lulu (Polydor Records, 1973)
With Barry Mann
 Barry Mann (Casablanca Records, 1980)
With Bette Midler
 Broken Blossom (Atlantic Records, 1977)
With Joni Mitchell
 Court and Spark (Asylum Records, 1974)
 The Hissing of Summer Lawns (Asylum Records, 1975)
 Hejira (Asylum Records, 1976)
With The Monkees
 The Birds, the Bees & the Monkees (Colgems, 1968)
 Instant Replay (Colgems, 1969)
 The Monkees Present (Colgems, 1969)
With Jack Montrose
 Blues and Vanilla (RCA Victor, 1956)
 The Horn's Full (RCA Victor, 1957)
With Walter Murphy
 Rhapsody in Blue (Private Stock, 1977)
With Michael Nesmith
 Nevada Fighter (RCA Records, 1971)
With Jack Nitzsche
 Heart Beat (Capitol, 1980)
With Kenny Nolan
 A Song Between Us (Polydor, 1978)
With Tom Pacheco
 The Outsider (RCA Records, 1976)
With Austin Roberts
 The Last Thing On My Mind (Chelsea, 1973)
With Howard Roberts
 Antelope Freeway (Impulse!, 1971)
With Lalo Schifrin
 There's a Whole Lalo Schifrin Goin' On (Dot, 1968)
 Mannix (Paramount, 1968)
 Bullitt (soundtrack) (Warner Bros., 1968)
 Rock Requiem (Verve, 1971)
 Enter the Dragon (Warner Bros., 1973)
With Otis Spann
 Sweet Giant of the Blues (BluesTime, 1970)
With Barbra Streisand
 Stoney End (Columbia Records, 1971)
 ButterFly (Columbia Records, 1974)
With Jim Sullivan
 U.F.O. (Monnie, 1969)
With Gábor Szabó and Bob Thiele
 Light My Fire (Impulse!, 1967)
With Frank Zappa
 Hot Rats (Reprise Records, 1969)
 Chunga's Revenge (Reprise Records, 1970)
 Studio Tan  (DiscReet Records, 1978)
 The Lost Episodes (Rykodisc, 1996)
 Läther (Rykodisc, 1996)
 Quaudiophiliac (Barking Pumpkin Records, 2004)
 The Hot Rats Sessions (Zappa Records, 2019)

TV, film and motion picture soundtracks written by:
 Michel Legrand
 Nelson Riddle
 Michel Colombier
 Quincy Jones
 Tom Scott
 John Williams
 Henry Mancini
 Lalo Schifrin
 Johnny Mandel
 Charlie Fox
 Artie Butler
 Billy Byers
 Elmer Bernstein
 Michael Melvoin

References

External links

Max Bennett Interview NAMM Oral History Library (2007)

1928 births
2018 deaths
American jazz musicians
American session musicians
Mainstream Records artists
The Wrecking Crew (music) members
Musicians from Des Moines, Iowa
Musicians from Kansas City, Missouri
People from Oskaloosa, Iowa
American rock bass guitarists
American jazz bass guitarists
American male bass guitarists
Jazz musicians from Missouri
American male jazz musicians
L.A. Express members